Samuel (Sam) Burmister(1897-1962) was a professional wrestler from Estonia who represented the Russian Empire in the 1912 Olympic games as a lightweight. He was also a trainer of wrestlers, and performed in vaudeville and sideshows as a strongman.

Early life

Burmister was born in Estonia in 1897 to a Jewish family.  He participated in the 1912 Olympics for Russia. He served as a pilot in the Imperial Russian Air Force in World War I.
As the situation in Russia worsened for Jews after the war, Burmister left Russia on a world tour across Asia and the Pacific and America. His tour took him to Australia in 1925, and found the local wrestling scene so receptive that he decided to return permanently. Burmister emigrated to Brisbane in 1937.

Wrestling career

Burmister had an active career in professional wrestling from 1925 to 1934, including winning the 1929 Australian Heavyweight title. He was also World Jewish Wrestling Champion several times. The press described him as "a low-set, bull-necked, heavily torsoed fellow", and he was well-known and popular with audiences for his "vigorous methods"

In addition to his professional wrestling career, Burmister was also a vaudeville performer and sideshow strongman, under the stage name "The Modern Samson". Anecdotally, one of the highlights of his routine included driving nails into a pine board with his fists  and allowing a motor car to be driven across his chest. He also had a small cameo role in the 1925 Australian film "Those Terrible Twins"
Burmister switched from competitor to trainer in the late 1940s, training Australian rugby league and rugby union star Bob McMaster when the latter made his foray into professional wrestling.

Death

He died unexpectedly on 4 October 1962 in Brisbane, and is buried in the Jewish section of the Toowong Cemetery, Brisbane.

Championships and accomplishments
 Professional wrestling
Australian Catch-as-Catch-Can Championship (1 time)
Western Australian Heavyweight Championship (1 time)

References 

1897 births
1962 deaths
Australian male sport wrestlers
Australian male professional wrestlers
Burials at Toowong Cemetery
Australian strength athletes
Estonian expatriate sportspeople in Australia
Vaudeville performers
Olympic wrestlers from the Russian Empire
Wrestlers at the 1912 Summer Olympics
Jewish Australian sportspeople
Wrestlers from the Russian Empire
Soviet emigrants to Australia